HMS Gainsborough was a Hunt class minesweeper of the Royal Navy ordered towards the end of the First World War. She was laid down as HMS Gorleston, but renamed after the fox hunt of Gainsborough, Lincolnshire before her launch. She was sold in June 1928.

References
 

Hunt-class minesweepers (1916)
Ships built on the River Tyne
1918 ships